American Jewish World Service (AJWS) is a 501(c)(3) nonprofit international development and human rights organization that supports community-based organizations in 19 countries in the developing world and works to educate the American Jewish community about global justice. It is the first and only Jewish organization dedicated solely to ending poverty and promoting human rights in the developing world. Its headquarters are in New York City. AJWS has received a Four Star rating from Charity Navigator since 2002.

Mission 
Inspired by the Jewish commitment to justice, American Jewish World Service works to realize human rights and end poverty in the developing world.

Strategy
AJWS has a two-pronged strategy: It provides over $38 million annually to more than 450 social justice organizations in 19 countries in Africa, Asia, Latin America, and the Caribbean, and they advocate for laws and policies in the United States that will improve the lives of people around the world.

AJWS's international grantmaking and U.S. advocacy focus on five central issues: civil and political rights, land, water and climate justice, sexual health and rights, ending child marriage, and disaster relief.

Grantmaking
AJWS's grant-making is guided by the beliefs that grassroots organizations are best placed to envision, articulate and implement their own plans for the development of their communities, and that community development cannot take place when human rights are denied. In addition, AJWS believes women are critical drivers of community development and change, and that marginalized communities that are vulnerable to poverty and human rights violations are powerful agents of change and development when mobilized from within.

Advocacy
AJWS works to promote awareness and influence U.S. international policies and funding in relation to human rights, global health and poverty, by rallying members of the community to advocate for policies that will improve the lives of millions of people in the developing world.

AJWS's current advocacy priorities include retaining the centrality of human rights within U.S. foreign policy through funding, diplomacy and policy. This includes supporting the HER Act, which would legislatively repeal the Mexico City Policy, the Burma Human Rights and Freedom Act, which would sanction human rights violators in Burma, and working to stop, delay and mitigate new policies that undermine human rights abroad. Internationally, AJWS works to increase the quality and quantity of funds supporting grassroots groups so that said funds are flexible, longstanding and feminist in their approaches.

History 

AJWS was established in Boston, Massachusetts, on May 1, 1985, when Larry Phillips and Larry Simon, together with a group of rabbis, Jewish communal leaders, activists, business people, scholars and others, came together to create the first American Jewish organization dedicated to alleviating poverty, hunger, and disease among people across the globe.

In her book, If I Am Not for Myself: The Liberal Betrayal of the Jews, Ruth Wisse argues that AJWS is one of a group of left-of-center Jewish organizations and publications founded in the 1980s without explaining why a new, specifically Jewish organization was needed to address causes already being addressed by well-established, American charities to which many Jewish were already contributors. Wisse argues that the actual motivation was a need felt by highly educated Jews to counter rising antisemitism on the left by performative acts of "public avowals of kindliness and liberalism. "

The organization's first key achievement was its response to a volcano disaster in Armaro, Colombia, in 1986. In 1990, after moving headquarters to New York City, AJWS launched five new international development projects in Mexico, Honduras, and Haiti, which provided training programs in sustainable agriculture. In 1991, then AJWS President Andrew Griffel was elected to the Executive Committee of InterAction, a consortium of over a hundred international humanitarian organizations.

Shortly after the September 11th attacks, AJWS responded by receiving donations and making grants to groups that provide support to families of low-income workers. In 2004, AJWS responded to the Indian Ocean tsunami, and co-founded the Save Darfur Coalition. In 2006, AJWS helped organize a rally in Washington, D.C., against genocide, and has since conducted a series of other rallies throughout the country. In 2010, AJWS responded to the earthquake in Haiti, raising nearly $6 million for Haitian-led recovery efforts, and in 2011 launched Reverse Hunger: Ending the Global Food Crisis, a campaign to reform U.S. food aid policy. In 2013, AJWS launched the “We Believe” campaign, a national advocacy campaign that called on the U.S. government to promote human rights in the developing world by ending violence against women and girls, stopping hate crimes against LGBT people, and ending child marriage. In recent years, AJWS has responded to the East Africa hunger crisis and the Rohingya refugee crisis by providing immediate humanitarian aid and long-term, sustainable support to affected populations.

Leadership 
AJWS's current president and chief executive officer is Robert Bank. Bank has spent his career championing human rights as an attorney, activist and leader. He joined AJWS as executive vice president in 2009, and he had previously served in New York's municipal government and in the leadership of GMHC—one of the world's leading organizations combating HIV/AIDS. Robert has been honored with GMHC's Lifetime Achievement Award and the Partners in Justice Award from AVODAH: The Jewish Service Corps. Bank became president and chief executive officer in July 2016, succeeding Ruth Messinger, who presided over the organization for 18 years.

Ruth Messinger was formerly Manhattan Borough President and the Democratic nominee for Mayor of New York City in 1997. In late 2005, The Forward named Messinger in its annual "Forward 50" list of the most influential American Jews. Messinger returned to the Forward 50 in 2009, also the year she was invited to the White House to discuss the crisis in Darfur with President Barack Obama. Currently, she sits on the United States State Department's Religion and Foreign Policy Working Group and co-chairs the Sub-Working Group on Social Justice.

Impact
AJWS provides over $38 million annually to 450 social justice organizations in 19 countries in Africa, Asia, Latin America and the Caribbean, to address some of the gravest global problems, including genocide, AIDS, violence against women and girls, hatred of LGBT people, and consequences of natural and human-made disasters. Since its founding, AJWS has provided more than $360 million to support thousands of social justice organizations in the developing world that have taken on such challenges.

References

External links 
 
 Charity Navigator listing

Organizations established in 1985
Jewish charities based in the United States
Jewish refugee aid organizations
Jewish-American political organizations
Charities based in New York City
1985 establishments in Massachusetts